Homage to Catalonia is George Orwell's personal account of his experiences and observations fighting in the Spanish Civil War for the POUM militia of the Republican army.

Published in 1938 (about a year before the war ended) with little commercial success, it gained more attention in the 1950s following the success of Orwell's better-known works Animal Farm (1945) and Nineteen Eighty-Four (1949).

Covering the period between December 1936 and June 1937, Orwell recounts Catalonia's revolutionary fervor during his training in Barcelona, his boredom on the front lines in Aragon, his involvement in the interfactional May Days conflict back in Barcelona on leave, his getting shot in the throat back on the front lines, and his escape to France after the POUM was declared an illegal organization.

The war was one of the defining events of his political outlook and a significant part of what led him to write in 1946, "Every line of serious work that I have written since 1936 has been written, directly or indirectly, against totalitarianism and for democratic socialism, as I understand it."

Background

Historical context 
The Spanish Civil War broke out with a military coup in July 1936 after months of tension following a narrow victory by the leftist Popular Front in the February 1936 Spanish general election. Rebelling forces coalesced as the Nationalists under the leadership of General Francisco Franco and attempted to take over cities that remained under government control.

The Republican side, which viewed the Nationalists as fascists, was made up of several factions including socialists, anarchists, and communists. There was infighting between these factions, which Orwell details in his chapters on the May Days of Barcelona.

Biographical context

Joining the war 
Orwell left for Spain just before Christmas 1936, shortly after submitting The Road to Wigan Pier for publication, the first book in which he explicitly espouses socialism.

Within the first few pages of Homage to Catalonia, Orwell writes, "I had come to Spain with some notion of writing newspaper articles, but I had joined the militia almost immediately, because at that time and in that atmosphere it seemed the only conceivable thing to do." However, it has been suggested that Orwell intended all along to enlist.

Orwell had been told that he would not be permitted to enter Spain without some supporting documents from a British left-wing organisation, so he sought the assistance of the British Communist Party. When its leader, Harry Pollitt, asked if he would join the International Brigades, Orwell replied that he wanted to see for himself what was happening first. After Pollitt refused to help, Orwell contacted the Independent Labour Party (ILP), whose officials agreed to help him. They accredited Orwell as a correspondent for their weekly paper, the New Leader, which provided Orwell the means to go legitimately to Spain. The ILP issued him a letter of introduction to their representative in Barcelona, John McNair.

Upon arriving in Spain, Orwell is reported to have told McNair, "I have come to Spain to join the militia to fight against Fascism." While McNair also describes Orwell as expressing a desire to write "some articles" for the New Statesman and Nation with an intention "to stir working-class opinion in Britain and France", when presented the opportunity to write, Orwell told him writing "was quite secondary and his main reason for coming was to fight against Fascism." McNair took Orwell to the POUM (Catalan: Partit Obrer d'Unificació Marxista; English: Workers' Party of Marxist Unification), an anti-Stalinist communist party.

By Orwell's own admission, it was somewhat by chance that he joined the POUM: "I had only joined the P.O.U.M. militia rather than any other because I happened to arrive in Barcelona with I.L.P. papers." He later notes, "As far as my purely personal preferences went I would have liked to join the Anarchists." He also nearly joined Communist International's International Column midway through his tour because he thought they were likeliest to send him to Madrid, where he wanted to join the action.

Writing 
Orwell wrote diaries, made press-cuttings, and took photographs during his time in Spain, but they were all stolen before he left. In May 1937, he wrote the publisher of his previous books saying, "I greatly hope I come out of this alive if only to write a book about it." According to his eventual publisher, "Homage was begun in February [1937] in the trenches, written on scraps, the backs of envelopes, toilet paper. The written material was sent to Barcelona to McNair's office, where his wife Eileen Blair, working as a volunteer, typed it out section by section. Slowly it grew into a sizable parcel. McNair kept it in his own room."

Upon escaping across the French border in June 1937, he stopped at the first post office available to telegram the National Statesman, asking if it would like a first-hand article. The offer was accepted but the article, "Eye-witness in Barcelona",Eyewitness in Barcelona - George Orwell | Workers' Liberty was rejected by editor Kingsley Martin on grounds that his writing "could cause trouble" (it was picked up by Controversy). In the months after leaving Spain, Orwell wrote a number of essays on the war, notably "Spilling the Spanish Beans"Spilling the Spanish Beans | The Orwell Foundation and a praiseful review of Franz Borkenau's The Spanish Cockpit.

Writing from his cottage at Wallington, Hertfordshire, he finished around New Year's Day 1938.

Publication 
The first edition was published in the United Kingdom in April 1938 by Secker & Warburg after being rejected by Gollancz, the publisher of all Orwell's previous books, over concerns about the book's criticism of the Stalinists in Spain. "Gollancz is of course part of the Communism-racket," Orwell wrote to Rayner Heppenstall in July 1937. Orwell had learned of Warburg's potential willingness to publish anti-Stalinist socialist content in June, and in September a deal was signed for an advance of £150. "Ten years ago it was almost impossible to get anything printed in favour of Communism; today it is almost impossible to get anything printed in favour of Anarchism or 'Trotskyism'," Orwell wrote bitterly in 1938.

The book was not published in the United States until February 1952, with a preface by Lionel Trilling.

The only translation published in Orwell's lifetime was into Italian, in December 1948. A French translation by Yvonne Davet—with whom Orwell corresponded, commenting on her translation and providing explanatory notes—in 1938–39, was not published until 1955, five years after Orwell's death.

Per Orwell's wishes, the original chapters 5 and 11 were turned into appendices in some later editions. In 1986, Peter Davison published an edition with a few footnotes based on Orwell's own footnotes found among his papers after he died.

Chapter summaries
The appendices in this summary correspond to chapters 5 and 11 in editions that do not include appendices. Orwell felt these chapters, as journalistic accounts of the political situation in Spain, were out of place in the midst of the narrative and should be moved so that readers could ignore them if they wished.

Chapter one
Orwell describes the atmosphere of Barcelona in December 1936. "The anarchists were still in virtual control of Catalonia and the revolution was still in full swing ... It was the first time that I had ever been in a town where the working class was in the saddle ... every wall was scrawled with the hammer and sickle ... every shop and café had an inscription saying that it had been collectivized." Further to this, "The Anarchists" (referring to the Spanish CNT and FAI) were "in control", tipping was prohibited by workers themselves, and servile forms of speech, such as "Señor" or "Don", were abandoned. At the Lenin Barracks (formerly the Lepanto Barracks), militiamen were given instruction in the form of "parade-ground drill of the most antiquated, stupid kind; right turn, left turn, about turn, marching at attention in column of threes and all the rest of that useless nonsense".

He describes the deficiencies of the POUM workers' militia, the absence of weapons, the recruits mostly boys of sixteen or seventeen ignorant of the meaning of war, half-complains about the sometimes frustrating tendency of Spaniards to put things off until "mañana" (tomorrow), notes his struggles with Spanish (or more usually, the local use of Catalan). He praises the generosity of the Catalan working class. Orwell leads to the next chapter by describing the "conquering-hero stuff"—parades through the streets and cheering crowds—that the militiamen experienced at the time he was sent to the Aragón front.

Chapter two
In January 1937, Orwell's centuria arrives in Alcubierre, just behind the line fronting Zaragoza. He sketches the squalor of the region's villages and the "Fascist deserters" indistinguishable from themselves. On the third day rifles are handed out. Orwell's "was a German Mauser dated 1896 ... it was corroded and past praying for." The chapter ends on his centuria's arrival at trenches near Zaragoza and the first time a bullet nearly hit him. To his dismay, instinct made him duck.

Chapter three
In the hills around Zaragoza, Orwell experiences "mingled boredom and discomfort of stationary warfare," the mundaneness of a situation in which "each army had dug itself in and settled down on the hill-tops it had won." He praises the Spanish militias for their relative social equality, for their holding of the front while the army was trained in the rear, and for the "democratic 'revolutionary' type of discipline ... more reliable than might be expected." "'Revolutionary' discipline depends on political consciousness—on an understanding of why orders must be obeyed; it takes time to diffuse this, but it also takes time to drill a man into an automaton on the barrack-square."

Throughout the chapter Orwell describes the various shortages and problems at the front—firewood ("We were between two and three thousand feet above sea-level, it was mid winter and the cold was unspeakable"), food, candles, tobacco, and adequate munitions—as well as the danger of accidents inherent in a badly trained and poorly armed group of soldiers.

Chapter four
After some three weeks at the front, Orwell and the other English militiaman in his unit, Williams, join a contingent of fellow Englishmen sent out by the Independent Labour Party to a position at Monte Oscuro, within sight of Zaragoza. "Perhaps the best of the bunch was Bob Smillie—the grandson of the famous miners' leader—who afterwards died such an evil and meaningless death in Valencia." In this new position he witnesses the sometimes propagandistic shouting between the Rebel and Loyalist trenches and hears of the fall of Málaga. "... every man in the militia believed that the loss of Malaga was due to treachery. It was the first talk I had heard of treachery or divided aims. It set up in my mind the first vague doubts about this war in which, hitherto, the rights and wrongs had seemed so beautifully simple." In February, he is sent with the other POUM militiamen 50 miles to make a part of the army besieging Huesca; he mentions the running joke phrase, "Tomorrow we'll have coffee in Huesca," attributed to a general commanding the Government troops who, months earlier, made one of many failed assaults on the town.

Chapter five (orig. ch. 6) 
Orwell complains that on the eastern side of Huesca, where he was stationed, nothing ever seemed to happen—except the onslaught of spring, and, with it, lice. He was in a ("so-called") hospital at Monflorite for ten days at the end of March 1937 with a poisoned hand that had to be lanced and put in a sling. He describes rats that "really were as big as cats, or nearly" (in Orwell's novel Nineteen Eighty-Four, the protagonist Winston Smith has a phobia of rats that Orwell himself shared to a lesser degree). He makes reference to the lack of "religious feeling, in the orthodox sense," and that the Catholic Church was, "to the Spanish people, at any rate in Catalonia and Aragon, a racket, pure and simple." He muses that Christianity may have, to some extent, been replaced by Anarchism. The latter portion of the chapter briefly details various operations in which Orwell took part: silently advancing the Loyalist frontline by night, for example.

Chapter six (orig. ch. 7) 
Orwell takes part in a "holding attack" on Huesca, designed to draw the Nationalist troops away from an Anarchist attack on "the Jaca road." He suspects two of the bombs he threw may have killed their targets, but he cannot be sure. They capture the position and pull back with captured rifles and ammunition, but Orwell laments that they fled too hurriedly to bring back a telescope they had discovered, which Orwell sees as more useful than any weapons.

Chapter seven (orig. ch. 8) 
Orwell shares memories of the 115 days he spent on the war front, and its influence on his political ideas, "... the prevailing mental atmosphere was that of Socialism ... the ordinary class-division of society had disappeared to an extent that is almost unthinkable in the money-tainted air of England ... the effect was to make my desire to see Socialism established much more actual than it had been before." By the time he left Spain, he had become a "convinced democratic Socialist." The chapter ends with Orwell's arrival in Barcelona on the afternoon of 26 April 1937. "And after that the trouble began."

Chapter eight (orig. ch. 9) 
Orwell details noteworthy changes in the social and political atmosphere of Barcelona when he returns after three months at the front. He describes a lack of revolutionary atmosphere and the class division that he had thought would not reappear, i.e., with visible division between rich and poor and the return of servile language. Orwell had been determined to leave the POUM, and confesses here that he "would have liked to join the Anarchists," but instead sought a recommendation to join the International Column, so that he could go to the Madrid front. The latter half of this chapter is devoted to describing the conflict between the anarchist CNT and the socialist Unión General de Trabajadores (UGT) and the resulting cancellation of the May Day demonstration and the build-up to the street fighting of the Barcelona May Days. "It was the antagonism between those who wished the revolution to go forward and those who wished to check or prevent it—ultimately, between Anarchists and Communists."

Chapter nine (orig. ch. 10) 
Orwell relates his involvement in the Barcelona street fighting that began on 3 May when the Government Assault Guards tried to take the Telephone Exchange from the CNT workers who controlled it. For his part, Orwell acted as part of the POUM, guarding a POUM-controlled building. Although he realises that he is fighting on the side of the working class, Orwell describes his dismay at coming back to Barcelona on leave from the front only to get mixed up in street fighting. Assault Guards from Valencia arrive—"All of them were armed with brand-new rifles ... vastly better than the dreadful old blunderbusses we had at the front." The Communist-controlled Unified Socialist Party of Catalonia newspapers declare POUM to be a disguised Fascist organisation—"No one who was in Barcelona then ... will forget the horrible atmosphere produced by fear, suspicion, hatred, censored newspapers, crammed jails, enormous food queues, and prowling gangs ...." In his second appendix to the book, Orwell discusses the political issues at stake in the May 1937 Barcelona fighting, as he saw them at the time and later on, looking back.

Chapter ten (orig. ch. 12) 
Orwell speculates on how the Spanish Civil War might turn out. Orwell predicts that the "tendency of the post-war Government ... is bound to be Fascistic."

He returns to the front, where he is shot through the throat by a sniper, an injury that takes him out of the war. After spending some time in a hospital in Lleida, he was moved to Tarragona where his wound was finally examined more than a week after he'd left the front.

Chapter eleven (orig. ch. 13) 
Orwell tells us of his various movements between hospitals in Siétamo, Barbastro, and Monzón while getting his discharge papers stamped, after being declared medically unfit. He returns to Barcelona only to find that the POUM had been "suppressed": it had been declared illegal the very day he had left to obtain discharge papers and POUM members were being arrested without charge. "The attack on Huesca was beginning ... there must have been numbers of men who were killed without ever learning that the newspapers in the rear were calling them Fascists. This kind of thing is a little difficult to forgive." He sleeps that night in the ruins of a church; he cannot go back to his hotel because of the danger of arrest.

Chapter twelve (orig. ch. 14)
This chapter describes his visits accompanied by his wife to Georges Kopp, unit commander of the ILP Contingent while Kopp was held in a Spanish makeshift jail—"really the ground floor of a shop." Having done all he could to free Kopp, ineffectively and at great personal risk, Orwell decides to leave Spain. Crossing the Pyrenees frontier, he and his wife arrived in France "without incident".

Appendix one (orig. ch. 5)
Orwell explains the divisions within the Republican side: "On the one side the C.N.T.-F.A.I., the P.O.U.M., and a section of the Socialists, standing for workers’ control: on the other side the Right-wing Socialists, Liberals, and Communists, standing for centralized government and a militarized army." He also writes, "One of the dreariest effects of this war has been to teach me that the Left-wing press is every bit as spurious and dishonest as that of the Right."

Appendix two (orig. ch. 11) 
An attempt to dispel some of the myths in the foreign press at the time (mostly the pro-Communist press) about the May Days, the street fighting that took place in Catalonia in early May 1937. This was between anarchists and POUM members, against Communist/government forces which sparked off when local police forces occupied the Telephone Exchange, which had until then been under the control of CNT workers. He relates the suppression of the POUM on 15–16 June 1937, gives examples of the Communist Press of the world—(Daily Worker, 21 June, "Spanish Trotskyists Plot With Franco"), indicates that Indalecio Prieto hinted, "fairly broadly ... that the government could not afford to offend the Communist Party while the Russians were supplying arms." He quotes Julián Zugazagoitia, the Minister of the Interior; "We have received aid from Russia and have had to permit certain actions which we did not like."

Reception

Sales 
Homage to Catalonia was initially commercially unsuccessful, selling only 683 copies in its first 6 months. By the time of Orwell's death in 1950, its initial print run of 1,500 copies had still not all sold. Homage to Catalonia re-emerged in the 1950s, following on the success of Orwell's later books.

Reviews

Contemporary 
Contemporary reviews of the book were mixed. John Langdon-Davies wrote in the Communist Party's Daily Worker that "the value of the book is that it gives an honest picture of the sort of mentality that toys with revolutionary romanticism but shies violently at revolutionary discipline. It should be read as a warning". Some Conservative and Catholic opponents of the Spanish Republic felt vindicated by Orwell's attack on the role of the Communists in Spain; The Spectators review concluded that this "dismal record of intrigue, injustice, incompetence, quarrelling, lying communist propaganda, police spying, illegal imprisonment, filth and disorder" was evidence that the Republic deserved to fall. A mixed review was supplied by V. S. Pritchett who called Orwell naïve about Spain but added that "no one excels him in bringing to the eyes, ears and nostrils the nasty ingredients of fevered situations; and I would recommend him warmly to all who are concerned about the realities of personal experience in a muddled cause".

Notably positive reviews came from Geoffrey Gorer in Time and Tide, and from Philip Mairet in the New English Weekly. Gorer concluded, "Politically and as literature it is a work of first-class importance". Mairet observed, "It shows us the heart of innocence that lies in revolution; also the miasma of lying that, far more than the cruelty, takes the heart out of it." Franz Borkenau, in a letter to Orwell of June 1938, called the book, together with his own The Spanish Cockpit, a complete "picture of the revolutionary phase of the Spanish War".

Hostile notices came from The Tablet, where a critic wondered why Orwell had not troubled to get to know Fascist fighters and enquire about their motivations, and from The Times Literary Supplement and The Listener, "the first misrepresenting what Orwell had said and the latter attacking the POUM, but never mentioning the book".

Later 
The book was praised by Noam Chomsky in 1969. Raymond Carr praised Orwell in 1971 for being "determined to set down the truth as he saw it."

In his 1971 memoir, Herbert Matthews of The New York Times declared, "The book did more to blacken the Loyalist cause than any work written by enemies of the Second Republic." In 1984 Lawrence and Wishart published Inside the Myth, a collection of essays "bringing together a variety of standpoints hostile to Orwell in an obvious attempt to do as much damage to his reputation as possible," per John Newsinger.

Aftermath
Within weeks of leaving Spain, a deposition (discovered in 1989) was presented to the Tribunal for Espionage & High Treason, Valencia, charging the Orwells with 'rabid Trotskyism' and being agents of the POUM. The trial of the leaders of the POUM and of Orwell (in his absence) took place in Barcelona, in October and November 1938. Observing events from French Morocco, Orwell wrote that they were "only a by-product of the Russian Trotskyist trials and from the start every kind of lie, including flagrant absurdities, has been circulated in the Communist press."

Georges Kopp, deemed "quite likely" shot in the book's final chapter, was released in December 1938.

Barcelona fell to Franco's forces on 26 January 1939, and on 1 April 1939, the last of the Republican forces surrendered.

Effect on Orwell

Health 
Orwell never knew the source of his tuberculosis, from complications of which he died in 1950. However, in 2018, researchers studying bacteria on his letters announced that there was a "very high probability" that Orwell contracted the disease in a Spanish hospital.

Politics 
Orwell reflected that he "had felt what socialism could be like" and, according to biographer Gordon Bowker, "Orwell never did abandon his socialism: if anything, his Spanish experience strengthened it." In a letter to Cyril Connolly, written on 8 June 1937, Orwell said, "At last [I] really believe in Socialism, which I never did before". A decade later he wrote: "Every line of serious work that I have written since 1936 has been written, directly or indirectly, against totalitarianism and for democratic Socialism, as I understand it."

Orwell's experiences, culminating in his and his wife Eileen O'Shaughnessy's narrow escape from the communist purges in Barcelona in June 1937, greatly increased his sympathy for the POUM and, while not affecting his moral and political commitment to socialism, made him a lifelong anti-Stalinist.

After reviewing Koestler's bestselling Darkness at Noon, Orwell decided that fiction was the best way to describe totalitarianism. He soon wrote Animal Farm, "his scintillating 1944 satire on Stalinism".

Works inspired by the book 
Orwell himself went on to write a poem about the Italian militiaman he described in the book's opening pages. The poem was included in Orwell's 1942 essay "Looking Back on the Spanish War", published in New Road in 1943. The closing phrase of the poem, "No bomb that ever burst shatters the crystal spirit", was later taken by George Woodcock for the title of his Governor General's Award-winning critical study of Orwell and his work, The Crystal Spirit (1966).

In 1995 Ken Loach released the film Land and Freedom, heavily inspired by Homage to Catalonia.

Homage to Catalonia influenced Rebecca Solnit's second book, Savage Dreams.

See also
 Anarchist Catalonia
 Bibliography of George Orwell
 ILP Contingent described in Homage to Catalonia
 Les grands cimetières sous la lune
 Spanish Revolution
 William Herrick 'an American Orwell', also disillusioned by Stalinism in Spain

References

External links

 
 Homage to Catalonia – Searchable, indexed etext.
 Homage to Catalonia Complete book with publication data and search option.
 Homage to Catalonia Complete book as plain text.
 Looking back on the Spanish War – an essay written 6 years later.
 

1938 non-fiction books
Anarchism in Spain
Barcelona in popular culture
Books about anarchism
Books by George Orwell
History of Catalonia
Political autobiographies
POUM
Secker & Warburg books
Spanish Civil War books
Works about Stalinism